This is a list of some organised crime figures within the underworld of the United Kingdom.

References

Mobsters
 
Organized crime-related lists
Mobsters